The 1970 European Wrestling Championships  was held from 9 to 17 June 1970 in East Berlin, East Germany.

Medal table

Medal summary

Men's freestyle

Men's Greco-Roman

References

External links
Fila's official championship website

Europe
W
European Wrestling Championships
Sports competitions in Berlin
1970 in European sport